Micciche or Miccichè is an Italian surname from Sicily. Notable people with the surname include:

Carmelo Micciche (born 1963), French footballer
Dan Micciche (born 1979), British football manager
Francesco Miccichè (born 1943), Italian Roman Catholic prelate
Francesco Miccichè (born 1958), Italian politician
Gianfranco Miccichè (born 1954), Italian politician
Peter Micciche (born 1961), American politician